Piz Serra is a mountain of the Livigno Alps, located on the border between Italy and Switzerland. The northern side of the mountain (Graubünden) is part of the Swiss National Park. The southern side of the mountain (Lombardy) is part of the Stelvio National Park.

References

External links
 Piz Serra on Hikr

Mountains of the Alps
Alpine three-thousanders
Mountains of Graubünden
Mountains of Lombardy
Italy–Switzerland border
International mountains of Europe
Mountains of Switzerland
Zernez